The Carol Bolt Award is an annual Canadian literary award. Presented by the Playwrights Guild of Canada, the award is bestowed for a theatrical play premiere by a PGC member, judged to be the year's best. The award is named in memory of Canadian playwright, Carol Bolt.

Winners
2002 - Kent Stetson, The Harps of God
2003 - Daniel Goldfarb, Adam Baum and the Jew Movie 
2004 - Florence Gibson, Home Is My Road
2005 - Mieko Ouchi, The Red Priest (Eight Ways To Say Goodbye)
2006 - John Mighton, Half Life
2007 - Stephen Massicotte, The Oxford Roof Climber's Rebellion
2008 - Colleen Murphy, The December Man
2009 - Vern Thiessen, Vimy
2010 - Michael Nathanson, Talk
2011 - Anusree Roy, Brothel #9
2012 - Don Hannah, The Cave Painter
2013 - David Yee, carried away on the crest of a wave
2014 - Colleen Murphy, Pig Girl
2015 - Jordan Tannahill, Concord Floral
2016 - Lisa Codrington, Up the Garden Path
2017 - Kate Hennig, The Virgin Trial
2018 - Matthew Mackenzie, Bears
2019 - Amy Rutherford, Mortified
2020 - Keith Barker, This Is How We Got Here
2021 - No Award was presented this year due to the COVID-19 pandemic

References

External links
Carol Bolt Award Past Recipients at the Playwrights Guild of Canada

Canadian dramatist and playwright awards